Asheldham is a village and civil parish in Essex, England. The village is in the district of Maldon and the parliamentary constituency of Maldon & East Chelmsford. The village is part of the combined Asheldham and Dengie Parish Council. 

It is on the Dengie peninsula, and is about 12 miles by road from Maldon. According to the 2001 census it had a population of 150, reducing to 142 at the Census 2011. The former parish church, dedicated to St Lawrence became redundant in May 1973 and was converted into use as a youth church and residential centre for the Chelmsford Diocese. With a chancel, nave and tower dating from the 1300s, it is a Grade II listed building.

A Ham class minesweeper, HMS Asheldham, launched in September 1953 was named after the hamlet.

Archeological excavations into Romano-British field systems, Anglo-Saxon graves and medieval buildings have taken place in the village.

References

External links
 
 Information and photographs of Asheldham village
 The history of Asheldham
 

Villages in Essex
Maldon District
Civil parishes in Essex